Sunday Morning with Charley Pride is a studio album by American country music artist Charley Pride. It was released in April 1976 via RCA Victor Records and was produced by Jerry Bradley. It was Pride's twenty second studio record released in his music career and contained ten tracks. The album was also Pride's second collection of gospel recordings.

Background and content
In 1971, Charley Pride released his first gospel collection titled, Did You Think to Pray. Spawning the minor hit, "Let Me Live," the album itself would win a Grammy award and Pride would continue having a successful country music career in the 1970s. The success of his first gospel album inspired the release of Sunday Morning with Charley Pride. The project had actually been recorded two years prior, in January 1974. Sessions were held at the RCA Victor Studio, located in Nashville, Tennessee. The sessions were produced by Jerry Bradley. The album consisted of ten tracks. All of the album's tracks were new recordings of gospel recordings. They featured vocal accompaniment by The Nashville Edition and The Jordanaires.

Release and reception
Sunday Morning with Charley Pride was released in April 1976 on RCA Victor Records. Its release would make it Pride's twenty second studio album released in his career. The album was distributed as a vinyl LP, containing five songs on each side of the record. In the 2010s, it was reissued in a digital format to music download and streaming services, including Apple Music. The album spent a total of 11 weeks on the Billboard Top Country Albums and peaked at number 14 in July 1976. The album spawned one single, "I Don't Deserve a Mansion." The song was issued as a single on RCA Victor, but failed to make any Billboard chart publications. In 1976, the album would receive an accolade for Best Gospel Album by a Non-Gospel Artist at the 8th GMA Dove Awards. In later years, Allmusic would give the record a rating of 2 out of 5 stars.

Track listing

Vinyl version

Digital version

Personnel
All credits are adapted from the liner notes of Sunday Morning with Charley Pride.

Musical personnel
 David Briggs – organ, piano
 Jimmy Capps – guitar
 Johnny Gimble – fiddle
 Lloyd Green – steel guitar
 Buddy Harman – drums
 The Jordanaires – background vocals
 The Nashville Edition – background vocals
 Charley Pride – lead vocals
 Hal Rugg – steel guitar
 Dale Seller – guitar
 Jerry Shook – guitar
 Tommy Williams – fiddle
 Chip Young – guitar
 Joe Zinkan – bass

Technical personnel
 Jerry Bradley – producer
 Herb Burnette – art direction
 Ray Butts – recording technician
 Dennis Carney – artwork, photography
 John Donegan – photography
 Bill Harris – engineer
 Tom Pick – engineer
 Roy Shockley – recording technician
 Bill Vandevort – recording technician

Chart performance

Release history

References

1976 albums
Albums produced by Jerry Bradley (music executive)
Albums produced by Charley Pride
Charley Pride albums
RCA Victor albums